Still Laugh-In: The Stars Celebrate is a Netflix variety special written by Jon Macks, narrated by Tiffany Haddish and Neil Patrick Harris and filmed at the Dolby Theatre in Los Angeles. It is a tribute to Rowan & Martin's Laugh-In, the American sketch comedy television program that ran for 140 episodes from January 22, 1968 to March 12, 1973 on the NBC television network, hosted by comedians Dan Rowan and Dick Martin.

Premise
In Still Laugh-In: The Stars Celebrate, the hosts plays clips from the original series, and intercuts them with new takes on the show’s classic recurring bits by original cast members like Ruth Buzzi, Arte Johnson, Judy Carne, Jo Anne Worley, Goldie Hawn and more.

Cast
 Tony Hale
 Tiffany Haddish
 Neil Patrick Harris
 Michael Douglas
 Rita Moreno
 Natasha Leggero
 Rob Riggle
 Rita Wilson
 Lily Tomlin
 Billy Crystal
 Brad Garrett
 Taye Diggs
 Lisa Ann Walter
 Nikki Glaser
 Jon Lovitz
 Ruth Buzzi
 Goldie Hawn
 Arte Johnson
 Judy Carne (archive footage)
 Jo Anne Worley

Release
'Still Laugh-In: The Stars Celebrate' was released on May 14, 2019 on Netflix.

References

External links
 
 
 

English-language television shows
Netflix specials
2010s English-language films